50 Photographs is a photo book by American visual artist Jessica Lange, published by powerHouse Books on November 18, 2008. Featuring an introduction written by the National Book Award-winner Patti Smith, the art work distributed by Random House is the official debut of Lange as a photographer.

Background 
Before engulfing herself in an acting career, Lange studied art and photography at the University of Minnesota, as well made a few documentary films in Europe in the late 1960s. While at the university, she formed a relationship with photographer Francisco "Paco" Grande. The pair married in 1970 and Lange dropped out of the school in favor of travelling with Grande throughout the United States. Their relationship would eventually end in 1981, however.

She returned to photography many years later, when her latter partner Sam Shepard brought home from a movie set a Leica camera. After three decades in front of the cameras, she then rehabilitated her former dream of being on the other side of the lens, initially photographing her children.

Development 
Approximately five years before her first set saw its eventual release, Lange showed some of her work to French film photographer Brigitte Lacombe that began her campaign in 1975, as well to Wim Wenders' wife Donata who also became involved in visual arts herself. Encouraged with both fellow artists to "think bigger", she thus started printing at a professional lab and decided to release a book of her own pictures.
When I first showed them to Brigitte Lacombe, she said to me, 'Oh, Jessie. Why are you still so lonely?' And [I] realized that I'm attracted to people in solitary situations that are evocative of lonesomeness.

Her collection of fifty black-and-white studies of unknown people and far-away places was published under title 50 Photographs through powerHouse Books on November 18, 2008, and along with a special contribution written by Patti Smith (pictured top right).

Titled and signed by the actress au verso in pencil, all the pictures were shot mostly during Lange's considerable travels in such places as Ethiopia, Mexico, Romania and Russia. Some of them though, were also taken in the northern part of her native Minnesota and in New York, respectively.

Art exhibitions

2008—2009: United States

Howard Greenberg Gallery 
Lange's first art exhibition took place at Howard Greenberg Gallery, located on the northeast corner at 41-45 East 57th Street and Madison Avenue in a tower block known for housing a number of important galleries in N.Y.C., New York. A member of the Association of International Photography Art Dealers (AIPAD), originally known as Photofind (1981), the Midtown's gallery in demonstrates photojournalism and street photography covering a variety of other genres, such as contemporary photography, Photo-Secession (Camera Work), vintage prints (Time, LIFE), in addition to styles spanning from pictorialism to modernism.

Her exhibit entitled Jessica Lange: Photographs, introduced twenty-nine black-and-white pictures, all being displayed on the Howard Greenberg Gallery's main space from November 26, 2008 until January 10 the following year. Some of the Paul Strand's work took by himself in the northern region of Africa, served as an instrumental thematic show.

Butler Institute of American Art 

Lange was the guest of honor for the 50th anniversary of the Butler Institute of American Art in Youngstown, Ohio, where her 50 Photographs exhibition was on display from May 12 to July 5, 2009. In the U.S. House of Representatives, Congressman Tim Ryan noted that "The collection of her photographs shown here at the Butler capture a range of diverse subject matter from her years of travel. Due to her artistic vision, we are able to be a part of a fifteen year trek from Romania to Ethiopia and back to her home state of Minnesota."

Rosegallery 
Shortly after the release of her latest TV film, Grey Gardens (2009), Lange's images received their exposure on July 14 through ROSEGALLERY at Bergamot Station, placed in a Santa Monica's art complex on Michigan Avenue. Founded in 1991, the gallery carries a lineup of diverse modern and contemporary artists.

A thirty-one photograph show simply named Jessica Lange, was co-produced by Howard Greenberg Gallery and Motion Picture & Television Fund in common. Lange attended a reception which followed four days later.

George Eastman House 
In an attempt to showcase more visual liberties, George Eastman House - International Museum of Photography & Film in Rochester, NY enhanced her photographic work with the retrospective series of her five feature films Jessica Lange Thursdays, screening her performances delivered for The Postman Always Rings Twice (on July 2), Tootsie (on July 9), Music Box (on July 16), Blue Sky (on July 23) and Titus (on July 30). Besides, a tribute evening was held at Dryden Theater on July 25, preceded with a Lange's personal presentation of her then current movie release, Grey Gardens. As a result, she was given the first George Eastman House Honors Award ever that night.

Lange's second museum venue named after her book occurred on July 18, demonstrating thirty-three photos taken from the publication. The show was opened to public by September 20, 2009.

A Gallery for Fine Photography 
The venue for the fifth and final promo exhibition of Lange's premier monograph became A Gallery for Fine Photography, based in the French Quarter at 241 Chartres Street in New Orleans, Louisiana. Another member of AIPAD, the gallery presents contemporary and classic photography from the 19th, 20th and 21st century.

Other appearances

Art fairs and festivals

Reception

Critical response 
Selections from her premiere photo-book were initially published in the spring 2007 issue of Aperture. The magazine devoted to fine art photography then wrote: "Jessica's photographs very much reflect her personality. They are delicate, but powerful... loving, warm, and extremely poetic."

Awards

Commercial performance 
According to an article published by the online art magazine artnet on December 4, 2008, 50 Photographs sold out its initial printing in a two-week period since the official release.

Samples

See also
 Jessica Lange awards 
 Jessica Lange bibliography
 Jessica Lange discography
 Jessica Lange filmography

Footnotes

References

Sources

External links

Photo-book
Jessica Lange - 50 Photographs (official website on powerHouse Books)
Jessica Lange - 50 Photographs (official website on Random House)
Art exhibitions
Jessica Lange - Jessica Lange: Photographs at Howard Greenberg Gallery
Jessica Lange - Jessica Lange at ROSEGALLERY
Jessica Lange  - 50 Photographs by Jessica Lange at A Gallery for Fine Photography
Jessica Lange - 50 Photographs by Jessica Lange at George Eastman House

Books by Jessica Lange
2008 non-fiction books
Photographic collections and books
PowerHouse Books books